Ridgeway is a rural / residential locality in the local government area (LGA) of Hobart in the Hobart LGA region of Tasmania. The 2016 census recorded a population of 175 for the state suburb of Ridgeway.
It is a suburb of Hobart, located south of Dynnyrne.

In Ridgeway there are two plant nurseries (Plants of Tasmania Nursery and Island Bonsai), and a small number of homes. Prior to the 1967 bushfires, Ridgeway was a market garden area with its own school and church. There also used to be another nursery next to Plants of Tasmania.

History 
Ridgeway was gazetted as a locality in 1963.

Geography
Sandy Bay Rivulet forms the north-western boundary, while Dunns Creek forms part of the south-eastern.

Road infrastructure
Route B64 (Huon Road) runs along the western boundary, from where Chimney Pot Hill Road provides access to the locality.

References

Year of establishment missing
Localities of City of Hobart